Henri Borghi, O.S.M. (1609 – November 1658) was a Roman Catholic prelate who served as Bishop of Alife (1658).

Biography
Henri Borghi was born in Castelnovo di Serivia, Italy in 1609 and ordained a priest in the Order of Friar Servants of Mary.
On 25 February 1658, he was appointed during the papacy of Pope Alexander VII as Bishop of Alife. 
On 10 March 1658, he was consecrated bishop by Giulio Cesare Sacchetti, Cardinal-Bishop of Sabina, with Patrizio Donati, Bishop Emeritus of Minori, and Ambrogio Landucci, Titular Bishop of Porphyreon, serving as co-consecrators. 
He served as Bishop of Alife until his death in November 1658.

See also 
Catholic Church in Italy

References

External links and additional sources
 (for Chronology of Bishops) 
 (for Chronology of Bishops) 

17th-century Italian Roman Catholic bishops
Bishops appointed by Pope Alexander VII
1609 births
1658 deaths
Servite bishops
Servites